Fluorcaphite is a mineral with the chemical formula . It is found in the Kola Peninsula in Russia. Its crystals are hexagonal (dipyramidal class) and are transparent with a vitreous luster. It is light to bright yellow, leaves a white streak and is rated five on the Mohs Scale. Fluorcaphite is radioactive.

References 

Calcium minerals
Strontium minerals
Lanthanide minerals
Sodium minerals
Phosphate minerals
Hexagonal minerals
Minerals in space group 173
Fluorine minerals